Prunus subcoriacea is a species of tree in the family Rosaceae. It is native to South America.

Description 
P. subcoriacea is a tree up to 12 m tall, with rounded crown. Flowers white or yellowish, arranged in axillary racemes up to 5 cm long.

Distribution and habitat 
P. subcoriacea occurs in Brazil, Uruguay, Argentina and Paraguay in forests and along watercourses up to 1800 m of elevation.

References 

Prunus
Trees of Brazil
Trees of Argentina